The 2014 Mountain West Conference baseball tournament took place from May 21 through 25.  All seven of the league's teams met in the double-elimination tournament held at University of Nevada, Las Vegas's Earl E. Wilson Stadium.  This is San Jose State's first year in the league after joining from the Western Athletic Conference.  San Diego State won the tournament, earning the Mountain West's automatic bid to the 2014 NCAA Division I baseball tournament.

Format and seeding
The conference's seven teams were seeded based on winning percentage during the round-robin regular season schedule.  The bottom two seeds played a single-elimination game prior to the main six-team double-elimination bracket.  The top two seeds received a bye to the second round, with the top seed playing the lowest seeded team that won its first round game, and the second seeded team playing the higher seeded first day winner.  The losers of the first day's first-round games played an elimination game in the double-elimination format. The higher seeded loser of the second round games in the winner's bracket played an elimination game in the third round of the loser's bracket. The lower seeded loser of the second round games in the winner's bracket played an elimination game in the second round of the loser's bracket.

 UNLV and New Mexico finished tied for first place and are Mountain West Conference regular-season co-champions. UNLV won 5 of the 6 games they played against New Mexico to take the #1 seed in the tournament.
 Air Force and San Jose State finished tied for sixth place. Air Force won 2 of the 3 games they played against San Jose State to take the #6 seed in the tournament.

Bracket

 * 10 innings
 **11 innings

All-Tournament Team
The following players were named to the All-Tournament Team.

Most Valuable Player
San Diego State junior catcher Brad Haynal was named Tournament Most Valuable Player. Haynal was the leading hitter in the tournament batting .636 (14 for 22) and was also the leader in runs scored with nine.

Championship Game

The tournament came down to a final game between San Diego State and UNLV with each team having already lost once. With the game tied at 3 in the top of the sixth inning, shortstop Evan Potter's sacrifice fly pushed across the go-ahead run giving the Aztecs a 4–3 lead which their bullpen held. T.J. Kendzora pitched 1 2/3 hitless and scoreless innings in relief to record the win. Aztecs' third baseman Ty France had three hits, an RBI, a run scored and a stolen base. Michael Cederoth recorded his 20th save of the season which is both a Mountain West and a San Diego State school record.

References

Tournament
Mountain West Conference baseball tournament
Mountain West Conference baseball tournament
Mountain West Conference baseball tournament
College baseball tournaments in Nevada
Sports competitions in the Las Vegas Valley